Coming Home is 2012 French drama film directed by Frédéric Videau. The film competed in competition at the 62nd Berlin International Film Festival in February 2012.

Cast
 Agathe Bonitzer as Gaëlle Faroult
 Reda Kateb as Vincent Maillard
 Hélène Fillières as Anne Morellini
 Noémie Lvovsky as Sabine Faroult
 Jacques Bonnaffé as Yves Faroult
 Grégory Gadebois as Frank
 Marie Payen as Juliette, la femme du train
 Pascal Cervo

References

External links

2012 films
2012 drama films
French drama films
2010s French-language films
2010s French films